WRC 8, also known as WRC 8 FIA World Rally Championship, is the official game of the 2019 World Rally Championship. The game was developed by French developer Kylotonn and published on 10 September 2019 by Bigben Interactive for Microsoft Windows, PlayStation 4, Xbox One and Nintendo Switch. The game carries an official World Rally Championship esports licence.

Development and release
WRC 8 was revealed as the official game of the 2019 FIA World Rally Championship in February 2019. It features dynamic weather and an entirely redesigned career mode reminiscent of Codemasters' Formula One series. The game also sees the addition of new classic cars, much like its main rival, Codemasters' Colin McRae Rally/DiRT series, including the Lancia Stratos and Renault Alpine. The game also offers more content than the previous game, with 102 special stages spread across the championship's 14 countries. The game was released to Microsoft Windows, PlayStation 4 and Xbox One in September 2019, and was later ported to Nintendo Switch on 31 October.

Reception

WRC 8 received "generally favorable" reviews, according to video game review aggregator Metacritic, with reviewers praising the major improvements made to both the game's physics and graphics.

Martin Robinson of Eurogamer praised the ongoing evolution of the series, saying that "it's a significant year for the series, having taken a year away and returning from its break revitalised and refreshed. In fact, having personally only kept a watching brief on Kylotonn's tenure on the series since it signed up with WRC 5, it feels like a different series entirely."

Accolades
The game was nominated for "Best Game" at the Pégases Awards 2020.

References

External links 
 

2019 video games
Esports games
Kylotonn games
Multiplayer and single-player video games
Multiplayer online games
Nacon games
Nintendo Switch games
PlayStation 4 games
Split-screen multiplayer games
Video games developed in France
Xbox One games
Windows games
World Rally Championship video games
Video games set in 2019
Video games set in Argentina
Video games set in Australia
Video games set in Chile
Video games set in Finland
Video games set in France
Video games set in Germany
Video games set in Italy
Video games set in Mexico
Video games set in Monaco
Video games set in Portugal
Video games set in Spain
Video games set in Sweden
Video games set in Turkey
Video games set in Wales